Liebenstein may refer to:
 Liebenstein, village and a former municipality in the district Ilm-Kreis, in Thuringia, Germany

People with the name
 Jakob von Liebenstein (1462–1508), Archbishop-Elector of Mainz
 John W. Liebenstein (1845–1924), American businessman and politician
 Kurt Freiherr von Liebenstein (1899–1975), German general during World War II
 Todd Liebenstein (born 1960), former American football defensive end